Risley is a civil parish in the Borough of Erewash in Derbyshire, England. The parish contains 17 listed buildings that are recorded in the National Heritage List for England. Of these, five are listed at Grade II*, the middle of the three grades, and the others are at Grade II, the lowest grade.  The parish contains the village of Risley and the surrounding area.  The listed buildings include a country house and structures in its grounds, a church and items in the churchyard, smaller houses, buildings associated with a school, a farmhouse and barn, and two mileposts.


Key

Buildings

References

Citations

Sources

 

Lists of listed buildings in Derbyshire